Ballinalack is a village and a townland in County Westmeath, Ireland.

Ballinalack is one of 15 townlands of the civil parish of Leny in the barony of Corkaree in the Province of Leinster. The River Inny meanders past forming the western boundary of the townland. The neighbouring townlands are: Cappagh to the north, Carrick and Grange to the east, Cullenhugh and Glebe to the south and Joanstown to the west.

In the 1911 census of Ireland there were 24 houses and 105 inhabitants in the townland, mostly centred in the village.

References

External links
Ballinalack at the IreAtlas Townland Data Base
Ballinalack at Townlands.ie
Ballinalack at Logainm.ie 

Townlands of County Westmeath
Towns and villages in County Westmeath